Shankar Prasad Chaudhary is a Nepalese politician and a member of Provincial Assembly of Madhesh Province belonging to Nepali Congress. Chaudhary, a resident of Jirabhawani Rural Municipality, was elected via 2017 Nepalese provincial elections from Parsa 4(A).

Personal life
Chaudhary was born on 23 October 1960 to father Satyanarayan Mahato and mother Lodari Devi.

Electoral history

2017 Nepalese provincial elections

References

Living people
1960 births
Madhesi people
21st-century Nepalese politicians
Members of the Provincial Assembly of Madhesh Province
Nepali Congress politicians from Madhesh Province
People from Parsa District